Mehelya is a genus name of colubrid snakes from Africa. Some species formerly assigned to the genus Mehelya are now found in the genera Gonionotophis, Gracililima,  or Limaformosa. They are collectively called file snakes due to their unusual scalation. They are not venomous.

Etymology
The generic name, Mehelya, is in honor of Hungarian zoologist Lajos Méhelÿ.

Species
There are five species within the genus Mehelya.

Mehelya egbensis  – Dunger's file snake
Mehelya gabouensis  – Gabou file snake
Mehelya laurenti  – file snake
Mehelya poensis  – forest file snake, western forest file snake
Mehelya stenopthalmus  – small-eyed file snake

Nota bene: A binomial authoity in parentheses indicates that the species was originally described in a genus other than Mehelya.

Geographic range
File snakes are found throughout much of sub-Saharan Africa, from the Cape of South Africa through Zimbabwe and Botswana to the Democratic Republic of the Congo and further.

Description
Their dorsal scales are most peculiar. Large patches of bare skin are seen, and scales are separated by large gaps. These scales are strongly keeled, giving the snake the feel of a file - hence the common name. Their body shape is triangular in cross section, which has been noted amongst other "cannibalistic" snakes, and may also provide some sort of benefit for them within their burrowing lifestyle.

Habitat
File snakes generally occupy more humid regions, but are found in hotter desert areas, too.

Behaviour
File snakes are, by nature, burrowers. They will occupy old, abandoned burrows of rodents where they shelter from the heat in the relative coolness underground.  They are also adept at burrowing for themselves, their flattened head aiding them to push their way through the earth and leaf litter. This genus is nocturnal, becoming active at night to hunt prey – other reptiles.

Diet
The genus Mehelya feeds mainly on snakes and small lizards, such as geckos. Like many genera that feed solely on snakes, it has developed a triangular body shape as opposed to the plump, rounded body of other snakes.

References

Further reading
Csíki E (1903). [no title]. Rovartani Lapok, Budapest 10 (10): 198 (footnote). (Mehelya, new genus). (in Latin).

Colubrids
Snake genera
Taxa named by Ernő Csíki